The 1954 Cork Senior Football Championship was the 66th staging of the Cork Senior Football Championship since its establishment by the Cork County Board in 1887. The draw for the opening round of the championship took place on 24 January 1954. The championship ran from 21 March to 3 October 1954.

Collins entered the championship as the defending champions.

On 3 October 1954, St. Nicholas' won the championship following a 2-11 to 0-03 defeat of Clonakilty in the final. This was their third championship title and their first title since 1941.

Results

First round

 Fermoy received a bye in this round.

Second round

Quarter-finals

 St. Nicholas' and St. Vincent's received byes in this round.

Semi-finals

Final

Championship statistics

Miscellaneous
 St. Nicholas' win the title for the first time since 1941
 St. Nicholas'  sister club Glen Rovers also won the Cork Hurling Championship to complete the double.
 Christy Ring wins a football title to add to his then eight hurling titles.

References

Cork Senior Football Championship